Dana Ward is a professor emeritus of Political Studies at Pitzer College, where he founded and maintains the Anarchy Archives and where he taught from 1982 through 2012. He was the Executive Director of The International Society of Political Psychology from July 1998 to the Fall of 2004. Dana Ward received his BA from University of California, Berkeley, an MA in political science from The University of Chicago, and a double PhD in political science and psychology from Yale University. Ward also served on the Psychology faculty at the Claremont Graduate University. Ward taught at St. Joseph's University during Fall 1981 through Spring 1982, at Ankara University in 1986 on a Fulbright Fellowship, at the Johns Hopkins-Nanjing University Center for Chinese and American Studies, from the fall of 1990 through the spring of 1992, and at Miyazaki International College, Miyazaki, Japan, from January 1995 through January 1997.

Publications
"Political reasoning and cognition: a Piagetian view," 
Review of "Emma Goldman: An Exceedingly Dangerous Woman," Mel Bucklin, Director, American Historical Review, October 2004, pp. 1248–49.
"Occupy, Resist, and Produce: Workers Take Control in Argentina", Divergences  Vol.1, 4 (November 2006)
"Herbert Read's Aesthetic Politics: Art and Anarchy," in 
"Alchemy in Clarens: Kropotkin and Reclus, 1877-1881." in New Perspectives on Anarchism. eds., Nathan Jun and Shane Wahl, Lexington Books, 2010.
"Anarchist Culture on the Cusp of the 20th Century", in Without Borders or Limits: An Interdisciplinary Approach to Anarchist Studies. Edited by Jorell A. Meleéndez Badillo and Nathan J. Jun. Newcastle upon Tyne: Cambridge Scholars Publishing, 2013, pp. 107–122

External links
Homepage at Pitzer College
The Anarchist Archives
Ward's Response to the 2004 Re-election of President Bush
The International Society of Political Psychology
Houses designed and built by Dana Ward and family

Year of birth missing (living people)
Living people
University of California, Berkeley alumni
University of Chicago alumni
Yale Graduate School of Arts and Sciences alumni
American anarchists
American political scientists
American political psychologists